The County of Mark (colloquially known as ) was a county and state of the Holy Roman Empire in the Lower Rhenish–Westphalian Circle. It lay on both sides of the Ruhr River along the Volme and Lenne rivers.

The Counts of the Mark were among the most powerful and influential Westphalian lords in the Holy Roman Empire. The name Mark is recalled in the present-day  district in lands south of the Ruhr in North Rhine-Westphalia, Germany. The northern portion (north of the Lippe river) is still called  ("Higher Mark"), while the former "Lower Mark" (between the Ruhr and Lippe Rivers) is—for the most part—merged in the present Ruhr area.

Geography 
The County of the Mark enclosed an area of approximately 3,000 km² and extended between the Lippe and Aggers rivers (north-south) and between Gelsenkirchen and Bad Sassendorf (west-east) for about 75 km. The east-west flowing Ruhr separated the county into two different regions: the northern, fertile lowlands of Hellweg Börde; and the southern hills of the Süder Uplands (Sauerland). In the south-north direction the southern part of the county was crossed by the Lenne. In the region of the Lower Lenne was the County of Limburg (1243–1808), a fiefdom of Berg.

The seat of the Counts of the Mark von de Marck or de la Marck was originally the Burg Altena in the Sauerland region, but moved to Burg Mark near Hamm in the 1220s. The county was bordered by Vest Recklinghausen, the County of Dortmund, the Bishopric of Münster, the County of Limburg, Werden Abbey, and Essen Abbey.

Coat of arms 

The coat of arms of the county was "Or a fess chequy Gules and Argent of three". These arms have been used by the city of Hamm since 1226. Many other places in the area include the red and white checkered fess in their arms as a reference to the county and often to their founders.

History 

Originally belonging to a collateral line of the counts of Berg at Altena, the territory emerged under the name of Berg-Altena in 1160. About 1198 Count Frederick I purchased the Mark Oberhof, a parish land (Feldmark) on the territory of the Edelherren of Rüdenberg, liensmen of the Cologne archbishop Philip von Heinsberg. Here Frederick had the Mark Castle (Burg Mark) erected as the residence of the new "Counts of the Mark". The nearby town of Hamm was founded by his son Adolf I, Count of the Mark in 1226, it soon became most important settlement of the county and was often used as residence.

In the 1288 Battle of Worringen, Count Eberhard II fought on the side of Duke John I of Brabant and Count Adolph V of Berg against his liege, the Cologne archbishop Siegfried II of Westerburg, titular Duke of Westphalia. As Brabant and its allies were victorious, the County of Mark gained supremacy in southern Westphalia and became independent of the Archbishopric of Cologne. The territory of Mark was for long restricted to the lands between the Ruhr and Lippe rivers ("Lower Mark"). New territories in the north ("Higher Mark") were gained during the 14th century in wars against the Prince-Bishopric of Münster.

In 1332 Count Adolph II married Margarete, the daughter of Count Dietrich VIII of Cleves. Adolph's younger son Adolph III upon the death of Dietrich's brother Count John acquired the County of Cleves on the western banks of the Rhine in 1368. In 1391 Adolph III also inherited the Mark from his elder brother Engelbert III and united both counties as "Cleves-Mark" in 1394.

In 1509 the heir to the throne of Cleves-Mark John III the Peaceful married Maria, the daughter of Duke William IV of Berg and Jülich. In 1511 he succeeded his father-in-law in Jülich-Berg and in 1521 his father in Cleves-Mark, resulting in the rule of almost all territories in present North Rhine-Westphalia in personal union, except for the ecclesiastical states. The dynasty of Jülich-Cleves-Berg became extinct in 1609, when the insane last duke John William had died. A long dispute about the succession followed, before the territory of Mark together with Cleves and Ravensberg was granted to the Brandenburg Elector John Sigismund of Hohenzollern by the 1614 Treaty of Xanten (generally accepted in 1666). It then became part of the Kingdom of Prussia after 1701.

In 1807 the County of the Mark passed from Prussia to France in the Treaties of Tilsit. In 1808 Napoleon then gave Mark to the elevated Grand Duchy of Berg, which was divided into four departments along the lines of Napoleonic France. Mark was in the Ruhr Department until the collapse of French power in 1813, when it returned to Prussia.

The Prussian administrative reform of 30 April 1815 placed Mark within Regierungsbezirk Arnsberg, Province of Westphalia. The Hohenzollern Prussian sovereigns remained Counts of the "Prussian County of the Mark" until 1918.
The "County of the Mark" has no official meaning anymore, but is used to informally refer to the region in North Rhine-Westphalia.

Counts de la Mark 

The House of La Marck is a cadet branch of Berg dynasty. Another surviving line of the House of Berg (more senior but less prominent in European History) became counts of Isenberg, then count of Limburg and Limburg Styrum.
 1160–1180 Eberhard I, son of Adolf IV, Count of Berg
 1180–1198 Frederick I, son of Eberhard I
 1198–1249 Adolph I, son of Frederick I. First Count of the House to name himself Count de La Marck in 1202; he scarcely used the titles of Berg and Altena
 1249–1277 Engelbert I
 1277–1308 Eberhard II
 1308–1328 Engelbert II
 1328–1347 Adolph II
 1347–1391 Engelbert III
 1391–1393 Adolph III, brother of Engelbert III, Count of Cleves since 1368 and former Bishop of Münster and Archbishop of Cologne
 1393–1398 Dietrich
 1398–1448 Adolph IV, son of Adolf III, also Count of Cleves 1394–1417, Duke of Cleves 1417–1448
 1437–1461 Gerhard, brother of Adolf IV – Regent in the County, not allowed to use the title Count de la Mark in his own rights
 1448–1481 John I, son of Adolph IV, also Duke of Cleves since 1448
 1481–1521 John II "The Babymaker", son, also Duke of Cleves
 1521–1539 John III "the Peaceful", son, also Duke of Jülich-Berg since 1511
 1539–1592 William "the Rich", son, also Duke of Jülich-Berg, Duke of Guelders 1538–1543
 1592-1609 John William, son, son, also Duke of Jülich-Berg

House of Hohenzollern 
 1614–1619 John Sigismund of Hohenzollern
 1619–1640 George William, son
 1640–1688 Frederick William I, son
 1688–1713 Frederick I, son, King in Prussia from 1701
 1713–1740 Frederick William I, son, King in Prussia
 1740–1786 Frederick II, son, King of Prussia from 1772
 1786–1797 Frederick William II, nephew, King of Prussia
 1797–1807 Frederick William III, King of Prussia
To France by the 1807 Treaty of Tilsit, incorporated into Grand Duchy of Berg

See also 
 de la Marck (French spelling of the family name which is often used in English)

Further reading 
 Julius Menadier: Die Münzen der Grafschaft Mark. Dortmund 1909.
 Aloys Meister: Die Grafschaft Mark, Festschrift zum Gedächtnis der 300-jährigen Vereinigung mit Brandenburg-Preußen. 2 Bde., Dortmund 1909.
 Margarete Frisch: Die Grafschaft Mark. Der Aufbau und die innere Gliederung des Gebietes besonders nördlich der Ruhr. Aschendorff, Münster in Westfalen 1937.
 Margret Westerburg-Frisch (Hrsg.): Die ältesten Lehnbücher der Grafen von der Mark (1392 und 1393). Veröffentlichungen der Historischen Kommission Westfalens, Bd. 28: Westfälische Lehnbücher, Bd. 1, Münster in Westfalen 1967.
 Uta Vahrenhold-Huland: Grundlagen und Entstehung des Territoriums der Grafschaft Mark. Dortmund 1968.
 Norbert Reimann: Die Grafen von der Mark und die geistlichen Territorien der Kölner Kirchenprovinz (1313–1368). Historischer Verein, Dortmund 1973.
 Ernst Dossmann: Auf den Spuren der Grafen von der Mark. Mönnig, Iserlohn 1983, .
 Oliver Becher: Herrschaft und autonome Konfessionalisierung. Politik, Religion und Modernisierung in der frühneuzeitlichen Grafschaft Mark. Klartext-Verlag, Essen 2006, .
 Stephanie Marra: Grafen von der Mark, Herzöge von Kleve-Mark und Jülich-Kleve (Hof). In: Werner Paravicini (Hrsg.): Fürstliche Höfe und Residenzen im spätmittelalterlichen Reich, Bd. 3, Thorbecke, Ostfildern 2007, . online Text

External links 

 Edicts of the Duchy of Berg and the County of Mark, 1418–1816 online
 Map of the County of Mark in 1789

 
Counties of the Holy Roman Empire
Former states and territories of North Rhine-Westphalia
Lower Rhenish-Westphalian Circle
Subdivisions of Prussia
States and territories established in 1198
States and territories disestablished in 1807
1198 establishments in Europe
1190s establishments in the Holy Roman Empire
1800s disestablishments in the Holy Roman Empire
1807 disestablishments in Germany
Former monarchies